The World Sailor of the Year Awards were launched in 1994 by World Sailing (formerly the International Sailing Federation) to reward individual sailors for outstanding achievements in the sport. The awards have been sponsored by Rolex since 2001.

List of winners

External links 

Awards established in 1994
ISAF World Sailor of the Year Awards